Sparedrus is a genus of false blister beetles in the family Oedemeridae. There are more than seven described species in Sparedrus.

Species
These seven species belong to the genus Sparedrus:
 Sparedrus albipilis Svihla, 1983
 Sparedrus aspersus (LeConte, 1886)
 Sparedrus depressus (Champion, 1889)
 Sparedrus lencinae Vazquez, 1988
 Sparedrus longicollis Svihla, 2006
 Sparedrus orsinii Costa, 1852
 Sparedrus testaceus (Andersch, 1797)

References

Further reading

 
 

Oedemeridae
Articles created by Qbugbot